The 2020–21 Coupe de France preliminary rounds, Normandy was the qualifying competition to decide which teams from the leagues of the Normandy region of France took part in the main competition from the seventh round.

A total of seven teams qualified from the Normandy preliminary rounds. In 2019–20 FC Rouen, US Granville and ESM Gonfreville all progressed furthest in the main competition, reaching the round of 32 before losing to Angers (1–4), Marseille (0–3) and Lille (0–2) respectively.

Schedule
A total of 394 teams from the region entered the competition. A preliminary round was required, with 82 teams from District leagues involved, which took place on 30 August 2020. The remaining teams from the District leagues, and teams from Régionale 2 and Régionale 3 divisions, totalling 275, entered at the first round stage on 6 September 2020. The 20 Régionale 1 teams entered at the second round stage on 13 September 2020.

The third round draw, which saw the entry of the clubs from Championnat National 3, was made on 15 September 2020. The fourth round draw, which saw the entry of the clubs from Championnat National 2, was made on 24 September 2020. The fifth round draw, which saw the entry of the two Championnat National clubs from the region, took place on 7 October 2020. The sixth round draw was made on 21 October 2020.

Preliminary round
These matches were played on 30 August 2020.

First round
These matches were played on 6 September 2020.

Second round
These matches were played on 11, 12 and 13 September 2020.

Third round
These matches were played on 19 and 20 September 2020.

Fourth round
These matches were played on 3 and 4 October 2020.

Fifth round
These matches were played on 17 and 18 October 2020.

Sixth round
These matches were played on 30 and 31 January 2021.

References

Preliminary rounds